George Archibald may refer to:

 George Archibald, 1st Baron Archibald (1898–1975), British Labour politician
 George Archibald (footballer) (1919–2006), Australian footballer for Melbourne
 George Archibald (jockey) (1890–1927), American jockey
 George Archibald (politician) (born 1946), Canadian provincial politician of the Progressive Conservative Party of Nova Scotia
 George Christopher Archibald (1926–1996), British economist
 George D. Archibald (1820–1902), American college president
 George W. Archibald (born 1946), North American ornithologist who founded the International Crane Foundation

See also